Michael Vandas (born 2 February 1991) is a Slovak professional ice hockey player who currently playing for HK Spišská Nová Ves of the Slovak Extraliga.

Career statistics

Regular season and playoffs

International

References

External links

 

Living people
Slovak ice hockey forwards
1991 births
HK Poprad players
HC Vítkovice players
HC Litvínov players
HKM Zvolen players
HC Slovan Bratislava players
HK Spišská Nová Ves players
Sportspeople from Poprad
Slovak expatriate ice hockey players in the Czech Republic
Slovak expatriate ice hockey players in the United States